The 1999 Belgian Grand Prix (formally the LVII Foster's Belgian Grand Prix) was a Formula One motor race held on 29 August 1999 at the Circuit de Spa-Francorchamps in Francorchamps, Belgium. It was the twelfth race of the 1999 Formula One World Championship.

The 44-lap race was won by British driver David Coulthard, driving a McLaren-Mercedes, after he started from second position. Finn Mika Häkkinen took pole position in the other McLaren-Mercedes, but Coulthard overtook him at the first corner and went on to lead all 44 laps. Häkkinen finished second, some 10 seconds behind, with German Heinz-Harald Frentzen third in a Jordan-Mugen-Honda.

Häkkinen took back the lead of the Drivers' Championship by one point from Eddie Irvine, who finished fourth in his Ferrari, while McLaren moved into the lead of the Constructors' Championship, nine points ahead of Ferrari.

Report

Background
The Grand Prix was contested by 22 drivers, in eleven teams of two. The teams, also known as Constructors, were McLaren, Ferrari, Williams, Jordan, Benetton, Sauber, Arrows, Stewart, Prost, Minardi and BAR.

Before the race, Ferrari driver Eddie Irvine was leading the Drivers' Championship on 56 points; McLaren driver Mika Häkkinen was second on 54 points. Behind them in the Drivers' Championship, David Coulthard was third on 36 points in the other McLaren, with Heinz-Harald Frentzen and Michael Schumacher on 36 and 32 points respectively. In the Constructors' Championship, Ferrari were leading on 94 points and McLaren were second on 90 points, with Jordan third on 42 points.

Following the Hungarian Grand Prix on 15 August, the teams conducted testing sessions at the Silverstone circuit on 17–19 August. Häkkinen set the fastest time on the first, second and final days of testing. Ferrari traveled to their testing circuit at Mugello on 18–20 August, running Schumacher on the final day after being cleared by doctors to test. After completing 20 laps, Schumacher suffered from ankle pain preventing him completing a physical training programme. Ferrari later announced that temporary replacement Mika Salo would continue to race for the team.

Several teams announced changes to their driver line-ups for the following season. Benetton confirmed that the team was retaining their driver line-up of Giancarlo Fisichella and Alexander Wurz, with an option for 2001. Sauber announced that it would sign up Salo on a two-year contract and retain Pedro Diniz. Jordan confirmed that it was signing Prost driver Jarno Trulli on a two-year contract, replacing Damon Hill.

Practice and qualifying

Four practice sessions were held before the Sunday race—two on Friday, and two on Saturday. The Friday morning and afternoon sessions each lasted an hour. The third and final practice sessions were held on Saturday morning and lasted 45 minutes. The Friday sessions were held in dry and sunny conditions. Häkkinen was quickest in the first session, with a time of 1:54.396 that was less than half a second faster than Coulthard. Williams driver Ralf Schumacher was just off Coulthard's pace; Salo, Irvine and Jean Alesi rounded out the top six; within 1.3 seconds of Häkkinen's time. In the second practice session, Coulthard was fastest with a time of 1:53.577, ahead of Häkkinen, Fisichella, Frentzen, Hill and Schumacher.

Saturday's afternoon qualifying session lasted for an hour. During this session, the 107% rule was in effect, which necessitated each driver set a time within 107% of the quickest lap to qualify for the race. Each driver was limited to twelve laps. Häkkinen clinched his tenth pole position of the season with a time of 1:50.329. He was joined on the front row by Coulthard, who was one-tenth of a second behind. Frentzen qualified third, though be believed he could have gone faster due to two separate red flag incidents.

BAR drivers Jacques Villeneuve and Ricardo Zonta both suffered massive, high-speed accidents at the fast Eau Rouge sweep during the qualifying session. Both accidents caused the session to be suspended.

Race
The conditions were dry for the race with the air temperature  and the track temperature . The drivers took to the track at 09:30 (UTC +2) for a 30-minute warm-up session.

Coulthard took the lead from Häkkinen at the start by going around the outside of La Source, the McLaren team-mates making light contact. After emerging ahead, Coulthard led every lap of the race to claim his second victory of the season, ten seconds ahead of his team-mate. Häkkinen refused to shake Coulthard's hand after the race.

Classification

Qualifying

Race

Championship standings after the race

Drivers' Championship standings

Constructors' Championship standings

References 

Belgian Grand Prix
Belgian Grand Prix
Grand Prix
August 1999 sports events in Europe